Project Hospital is a 2018 business simulation game developed and published by Czech studio Oxymoron Games for Microsoft Windows, MacOS, and Linux. Players are tasked with building and operating a hospital and treating patients' illnesses.

Gameplay 
The game has three tutorials, teaching the player the fundamentals of the game. Tasks include managing and hiring staff, and building. Building consists of Laying down foundation, building walls, adding floor tiles, doors, and windows. Players also need to have to look over the patients heading in and out off their hospital.

Expansions and DLCs 
On 26 November 2019, Oxymoron released the first DLC for Project Hospital, the free Doctor Mode add-on. With the Doctor Mode DLC, you may take over doctors and oversee their patients. On 24 April 2020, the Hospital Services DLC was released and introduced new features, such as cafeterias, a pathology department, pharmacies, and staff training. On 18 August 2020, the Department of Infectious Diseases DLC released, and added many infectious diseases, and an Epidemiology department along with an alternative stretcher model and a more contemporary waiting chair. On 20 October 2020, the Traumatology DLC was released and introduced new challenging events which let you deal with the consequences of different disasters, accidents or crime. This also included the Traumatology department. The DLC adds multiple objects such as the wheelchair, hi-tech hospital bed, an alternative more modern bedside table, a wall mounted heart monitor, a new equipment cabinet, and the helicopter.

Reception 

Project Hospital  has received "Generally favorable" reviews, according to review aggregator Metacritic.

See also 
 Two Point Hospital
 Hospital Tycoon
Theme Hospital

References

External links 
 

2018 video games
Business simulation games
Linux games
MacOS games
Windows games
Medical video games
Video games developed in the Czech Republic